Ian Robert Astbury (born 14 May 1962) is an English singer, best known as a founding member, lead vocalist and frontman of the rock band the Cult. During various hiatuses from the Cult, Astbury has fronted the short-lived Holy Barbarians in 1996, and later from 2002 to 2007 served as the lead singer of Riders on the Storm, a Doors tribute band that also featured Ray Manzarek and Robby Krieger from the original Doors.
He replaced Rob Tyner during an MC5 reunion in 2003, as well as appearing on several one-off guest vocal performances on other artists' songs.

Early life 
Ian Astbury was born in Heswall, Cheshire, and is of Scottish and English descent. He moved with his family to Hamilton, Ontario, Canada, from England in 1973 when he was 11. He attended Glendale Secondary School. Astbury's early musical influences took root in Hamilton, where he became a fan of David Bowie, Iggy Pop and The New York Dolls. He did not start performing until after his return to England.

In 1979, while living in Glasgow, Astbury was influenced by the Doors' song "The End", which he heard while watching the film Apocalypse Now, later describing this as "a religious experience".

Career

Early career 
In 1980, Astbury was in Liverpool, where he was active on the punk scene based around Eric's Club. He moved to Bradford in late 1980, and by 1981 he helped found the post-punk band Southern Death Cult, which lasted until March 1983. Along with guitarist Billy Duffy, bassist Jamie Stewart and drummer Raymond Taylor Smith, Astbury formed a new band, Death Cult, and released the Death Cult EP. To help broaden their appeal, the band changed its name to "The Cult" in January 1984 before appearing on the Channel 4 television show, The Tube.

The Cult's first album, Dreamtime, was released in 1984, followed by Love in 1985. Love featured the single "She Sells Sanctuary", which introduced the band to an international audience. Many songs of these early albums focus on Native American themes, a preoccupation of Astbury's. On their third album, Electric, The Cult made a transformation to a hard rock sound with the help of producer Rick Rubin.

After the release of the 1989 album Sonic Temple and the single "Fire Woman", Astbury relocated to Los Angeles, California, US.

1990s 
In 1994, The Cult returned with an untitled album and a musical change of pace. Their hard rock sound was gone, as a result of Astbury's growing interest in alternative music, fashion and introspective lyrics. Although the album produced two singles ("Coming Down" and "Star"), it was not a commercial success. They toured to support the album, but in Brazil creative differences with guitarist Duffy reached their nadir, which resulted in him leaving the band.

Astbury soon assembled another group of musicians and began writing new songs. He called the group The Holy Barbarians, and in 1996 the band released the album Cream, which was not a commercial success. The band appeared at the small Tunbridge Wells Forum, where Vic Reeves joined the band onstage for a rendition of "Wildflower".

Personal difficulties and a drive for further introspection drove Astbury away from his new group, and he began working on a solo album (eventually released as Spirit\Light\Speed).

In 1999, Astbury and Duffy reformed The Cult. The band signed a new contract with Atlantic Records, and in 2001 Beyond Good and Evil was released. The band initially enjoyed radio success with the single "Rise", until a falling out with Atlantic, which ended all commercial promotions and radio play for the album. Astbury described the fight with the record label as "soul destroying"; disillusioned, he brought The Cult to another hiatus in 2002.

2000s and beyond 

Astbury became lead singer of The Doors of the 21st Century in 2002. The group featured original Doors members Robby Krieger and Ray Manzarek.

In 2003, Astbury performed with the surviving members of MC5 at the 100 Club in London.

He re-formed The Cult with Duffy in 2006, for a series of live shows. In October 2007, The Cult released Born into This, including the single was "Dirty Little Rockstar". In 2009, The Cult announced a series of shows across Canada, the US, and various countries in Europe. It was billed as "'Love' Live", where the band performed the album, Love, in its entirety.

On 29 May 2010, the Japanese band Boris performed "The End" with Ian Astbury at Vivid Festival in Sydney. Boris and Astbury released a four-song EP in September 2010 on Southern Lord and Daymare Records, containing four tracks entitled "Teeth and Claws," "We are Witches," "Rain" and "Magickal Child."

Other musical ventures 
Astbury is featured on the UNKLE tracks "Burn My Shadow", "When Things Explode" and "Forever." He also sings "Flame On" on Black Sabbath lead guitarist Tony Iommi's solo album Iommi, and recorded a duet with Debbie Harry on her 1989 album Def, Dumb and Blonde, called "Lovelight".

In 2010, he provided the vocals for the song "Ghost" on guitarist Slash's self-titled solo album. The track also featured former Guns N' Roses guitarist Izzy Stradlin on rhythm guitar. Astbury is also credited for playing the drums on a track called "Gasp" by Japanese Cartoon.

Personal life 
Astbury lives in Los Angeles. He has played on the football team Hollywood United with Billy Duffy and Steve Jones of The Sex Pistols. He is a supporter of English Premier League club Everton FC. He married his first wife Heatherlyn Astbury in May 1992; they have two sons. On 26 May 2012, Astbury married The Black Ryder singer and guitarist Aimee Nash in Las Vegas.

Discography

The Cult 
Dreamtime (1984)
Love (1985)
Electric (1987)
Sonic Temple (1989)
Ceremony (1991)
The Cult (1994)
Beyond Good and Evil (2001)
Born into This (2007)
Choice of Weapon (2012)
Hidden City (2016)
Under the Midnight Sun (2022)

Holy Barbarians 
Cream (1996)

Solo 
Spirit\Light\Speed (2000)

Guest appearances 

 Deborah Harry, Def, Dumb & Blonde (1989) – backing vocals on "Lovelight"
 The Fuzztones - guest vocals
 Steve Jones, Fire and Gasoline (1999) – producer, guest vocals
 The Four Horsemen,Rockin is Ma Business (1991) – percussion, backing vocals
 Messiah, 21st Century Jesus (1993) – vocals on "Creator"
 Circus of Power, Magic and Madness (1993) – vocals on "Shine"
 Zen Mafia, California song and video (1999)
 Tony Iommi, Iommi (2000) – vocals on "Flame On"
 Various artists. Stoned Immaculate: The Music of The Doors (2000) – vocals on "Touch Me"
 Zilch guest vocalist (2001)
 Various artists, Sonic Revolution: A Celebration of The MC5 (2001) – vocals on "Kick Out the Jams"
 Unkle, War Stories (2007) – vocals on "Burn My Shadow" and "When Things Explode"
 Slash, Slash (2010) – vocals on "Ghost"
 Boris and Ian Astbury, BXI EP (2010)
 Boris, Heavy Rocks (2011) – backing vocals on "Riot Sugar"
 Unkle, Only the Lonely EP (2011) – vocals on bonus track "Forever"
 Nine Inch Nails, Bad Witch (2018) – backing vocals on "Shit Mirror"
 Unkle, The Road: Part II (Lost Highway)  (2019) – backing vocals on "Crucifixion / A Prophet"

References

External links 
The Cult official website
IMDb biography
Ian Astbury interview 2010

1962 births
People from Heswall
English emigrants to Canada
English songwriters
English heavy metal singers
English rock singers
English baritones
Gothic rock musicians
Hollywood United players
The Cult members
Living people
Association footballers not categorized by position
The Wondergirls members
British male songwriters
Association football players not categorized by nationality